Hnatyshyn is the surname of the following people

John Hnatyshyn (1907–1967), Ukrainian-Canadian lawyer and politician
Ramon Hnatyshyn (1934–2002), Canadian politician and Governor General, son of John
Gerda Hnatyshyn (born 1935), Canadian politician, wife of Ramon

See also
Hnatyshyn Foundation Visual Arts Awards, Award for Outstanding Achievement as an Artist